In Canada, Government House is a title given to the royal residences of the country's monarch, various viceroys (the governor general, the lieutenant governors), and territorial commissioners. Though not universal, in most cases the title is also the building's sole name; for example, the sovereign's and governor general's principal residence in Ottawa is known as Government House only in formal contexts, being more generally referred to as Rideau Hall. The use of the term Government House is an inherited custom from the British Empire, where there were and are many government houses.

There is currently no government house for the lieutenant governors of Ontario (repurposed in 1937 and demolished in 1961), Quebec (destroyed by fire in 1966), Alberta (closed in 1938 and repurchased and repurposed in 1964), or the Commissioner of the Northwest Territories. The lieutenant governor of Ontario has a suite within the Ontario Legislative Building, as does the lieutenant governor of Quebec in the Édifice André-Laurendeau.

Present government houses

Former government houses

See also
 Government House
 Government Houses of the British Empire and Commonwealth
 Governor's Mansion (disambiguation)

References

Notes

Sources

Official residences in Canada
Canada
Lists of buildings and structures in Canada